The Pacific Research Institute for Public Policy (PRI) is a California-based free-market think tank which promotes "the principles of individual freedom and personal responsibility" through policies that emphasize a free economy, private initiative, and limited government. PRI was founded in 1979 by British philanthropist Antony Fisher.

Sally Pipes has been president of the institute since 1991. She writes a regular column for Forbes.com, focusing on health care in the United States. In 2008 she founded the Benjamin Rush Institute as a conservative association for medical students with 20 chapters at medical schools across America. She is originally from Canada and became a U.S. citizen in 2006. She opposes single-payer health care systems.

Policy areas
The organization is active in the policy areas of education, economics, health care, the environment, and water supply. It operates the Center for California's Future, which has a goal of "reinvigorating California's entrepreneurial, self-reliant traditions" and the Laffer Center, which is "focused on educating people on free-markets and supply-side economics."

From 1996 through 2009, the organization published an annual Index of Leading Environmental Indicators, which tracked environmental trends worldwide. PRI started the Center for Medicine in the Public Interest, a New York-based think tank focusing on health policy.

In 2022, Pipes opposed federal efforts to cap copayments at $35 for insulin, and PRI opposed plans by California to back generic manufacturing of the drug.

Finances 
PRI's total revenues in 2020 were $5.6 million, according to ProPublica's Nonprofit Explorer database. The Lilly Endowment, connected to Eli Lilly and Company, is a significant donor, contributing $175,000 a year in grants to PRI since 2015, according to The Intercept.

See also

 American Enterprise Institute
 Cato Institute
 State Policy Network

References

External links
 
 Organizational Profile – National Center for Charitable Statistics (Urban Institute)

Organizations based in California
Political and economic think tanks in the United States
Research institutes in California
Conservative organizations in the United States
1979 establishments in California